The 2022 Miami Hurricanes football team (variously "Miami", "The U", "UM", "'Canes",) represented the University of Miami during the 2022 NCAA Division I FBS football season. The Hurricanes were led by first-year head coach Mario Cristobal, and played their home games at Hard Rock Stadium, competing as a member of the Atlantic Coast Conference (ACC).

Previous season
The Miami Hurricanes finished the 2021 season with a 7−5 record and a 5−3 record in conference play, earning them second place in the conference. Head coach Manny Diaz was fired after the regular season, and the team accepted the invitation to play in the 2021 Sun Bowl. On December 26, 2021, however, Miami withdrew from the bowl game, citing COVID-19 concerns and issues.

Mario Cristobal, the former head coach at the University of Oregon was hired as the Hurricanes next head coach.

Offseason

2022 NFL Draft

One Hurricane player, Jonathan Ford, a defensive lineman, was selected in the 2022 NFL Draft (by the Green Bay Packers).

Preseason

Award watch lists

Personnel

Coaching staff

Marwan Maalouf

Roster
Xavier Restrepo

Schedule

Rankings

Game summaries

Bethune–Cookman

Southern Miss

No. 24 Texas A&M

Middle Tennessee

North Carolina

Virginia Tech

Duke

Virginia

Florida State

Georgia Tech

No. 9 Clemson

References

Miami
Miami Hurricanes football seasons
Miami Hurricanes football